French Town is an unincorporated community in Washington County, in the U.S. state of Missouri.

French Town was named for the fact a large share of the early settlers were of French descent.

References

Unincorporated communities in Washington County, Missouri
Unincorporated communities in Missouri